Micrurapteryx parvula is a moth of the family Gracillariidae. It is known from Israel and Jordan.

References

Gracillariinae
Moths described in 1935